God Forbid is an American heavy metal band formed in East Brunswick, New Jersey in 1996.

History

Early career (1999-2004)
Building up a following in the late 1990s by touring with bands such as GWAR, Nile, Cradle of Filth and Candiria, God Forbid's first full album Reject the Sickness was released by 9volt Industries in 1999. This album received heavy rotation from WSOU-FM in the New York City area and the band was subsequently signed to Century Media Records, releasing the album Determination in 2001. They played on the MTV2 Headbangers Ball tour with Shadows Fall and Lamb of God.

Breakthrough (2004-2013)
In 2004, they released Gone Forever, which, along with a slot on Ozzfest's second-stage, increased their profile considerably. The next year, they released IV: Constitution of Treason, a concept album about the end of the world. It was their first album to enter the Billboard 200, debuting at number 118. In 2005 and 2006, they supported Trivium on their UK tour along with Mendeed and Bloodsimple. In late 2006 and early 2007, they headlined the Chains of Humanity tour.

In 2007, God Forbid's "To the Fallen Hero" won the Independent Music Award for Best Hard Rock/Heavy Metal Song. They released a DVD on June 10, 2008, and their fifth studio album, Earthsblood, was released on February 24, 2009, and landed at number 110 on the Billboard 200. God Forbid toured across the United States and Canada in the No Fear Energy Music Tour featuring Lamb of God and others in April.

In March 2009, Dallas Coyle left the band. His replacement for the upcoming tour was named as former Darkest Hour guitarist Kris Norris. He was later replaced by Matt Wicklund. In July 2009, God Forbid participated in the Rockstar Mayhem Festival along with Trivium, Bullet for My Valentine, Cannibal Corpse, All That Remains, Slayer, Marilyn Manson and many others.

In April 2010, the band issued an update that they started work on a new album. The new album is titled Equilibrium and was released on March 26, 2012.

From July 13 to August 28, 2012, God Forbid took part in Metal Hammer's  "Trespass America Festival" headlined by Five Finger Death Punch with additional support from Battlecross, Emmure, Pop Evil, Trivium and Killswitch Engage.

In late 2012, the band co-headlined the Party To The Apocalypse 2012 tour with Shadows Fall starring Thy Will Be Done and Trumpet The Harlot.

Breakup (2013-2022)
On August 16, 2013, Doc Coyle posted on his personal website that he has chosen to leave God Forbid. Following this, Corey Pierce had said that the band is no more by a post on his Facebook page "No more suspense, God Forbid is over. Sorry". Right after this, Byron Davis had posted on his Facebook page "It's Friday and my boy is home doing well and yes it's true GF is down. We are a family for the most part some move on while others keep it real like before the band began. I should feel sad but I don't right now because a new chapter has begun. I'll be seeing you all around somewhere. Believe that. Uncle Corey J needs some drums I have a guitar too for him. Blabbering".

During the hiatus, Doc Coyle joined Bad Wolves.

Reunion (2022-)
On March 14, 2022, the band announced they would be reuniting for the 2022 Blue Ridge Rock Festival in September, making it the first time in nine years the band will perform. Four months later, it was announced former As I Lay Dying guitarist Nick Hipa would be performing with the band for their reunion show.

Musical Style
God Forbid have been described as melodic death metal, death metal, metalcore, thrash metal, and as key-players in the new wave of American heavy metal.

Band members

Current members
 Doc Coyle — lead guitar, backing vocals (1996–2013, 2022–present)
 Corey Pierce — drums (1996–2013, 2022–present)
 Byron Davis — lead vocals (1997–2013, 2022–present)
 John "Beeker" Outcalt — bass (1997–2013, 2022–present)

Current touring members
 Nick Hipa — rhythm guitar (2022–present)

Former members
 Dallas Coyle — rhythm guitar, backing vocals (1996–2009)
 Matt Wicklund — rhythm guitar, backing vocals (2009–2013)

Touring
Kris Norris — rhythm guitar (2009)

Discography

Studio albums
Reject the Sickness (1999)
Determination (2001)
Gone Forever (2004)
IV: Constitution of Treason (2005)
Earthsblood (2009)
Equilibrium (2012)

EPs
Out of Misery (1998)
Better Days (2003)

Singles
"To the Fallen Hero" (2006, strictly limited tour single)

Compilation albums
Bring You to Your Knees...Guns N' Roses (2004)
Sickness and Misery (2007)

Videos
Beneath the Scars of Glory and Progression (2008, DVD)

References

External links

1996 establishments in New Jersey
African-American heavy metal musical groups
American melodic death metal musical groups
Metalcore musical groups from New Jersey
American thrash metal musical groups
Century Media Records artists
Heavy metal musical groups from New Jersey
Independent Music Awards winners
Musical groups established in 1996
Musical groups disestablished in 2013
Musical quintets
Sibling musical groups
Victory Records artists
Musical groups reestablished in 2022